Lewis Omer (August 28, 1876 – January 3, 1954) was an American football, basketball, and track coach.

Omer was born in 1876 in Clayton, Illinois. He attended the University of Illinois, graduating in 1902.

After graduating from Illinois, Omer became a school teacher. He then coached track and worked in the athletic department at Northwestern University from 1911 to 1917. He joined the United States Army in 1917, reached the rank of major, and was discharged in 1921.

From 1921 to 1936, Omer was the athletic director at Carthage College in Carthage, Illinois.  He was also the head coach for the Carthage Red Men football team for 15 seasons, from 1921 until 1935 compiling a record of 51–52–18. Omer later served as a mathematics professor at Carthage.

Head coaching record

Football

References

External links
 

1876 births
1954 deaths
Camp Grant Warriors football coaches
Carthage Firebirds athletic directors
Carthage Firebirds men's basketball coaches
Carthage Firebirds football coaches
Illinois Fighting Illini football players
Northwestern Wildcats track and field coaches
College track and field coaches in the United States
Carthage College faculty
University of Illinois Urbana-Champaign alumni
United States Army personnel of World War I
United States Army officers
People from Adams County, Illinois
Military personnel from Illinois